The South American weedfish (Ribeiroclinus eigenmanni) is a species of clinid found along the Atlantic coast of South America from southern Brazil to central Argentina where it has been found at a depth of about . This species is currently the only known member of its genus. The specific name honours the ichthyologist Carl H. Eigenmann (1863-1927).

References

External links
 Drawing

Clinidae
Fish described in 1888
Monotypic fish genera
Taxa named by David Starr Jordan